Annette Calud (born November 26, 1963) is an American actress.

Personal life 
Calud was born on November 26, 1963, in Milwaukee, Wisconsin.

Career

Theatre 
Calud was a member of the original Broadway production of Miss Saigon in 1991 where she was part of the Ensemble. She served as the understudy and alternate for Lea Salonga's Kim, later taking up the role full-time. She is the aunt of Eva Noblezada, who would later play the same role during the 2014 West End revival and 2017 Broadway revival.

Sesame Street 
Calud played Celina, a dance teacher, on Sesame Street from 1993 until 1998.

Television

Theatre

References

External links 

 

1963 births
Living people
Actresses from Milwaukee
American actresses of Filipino descent
American television actresses
American stage actresses
20th-century American actresses
21st-century American women